The bamboo warbler or bamboo scrub-warbler (Locustella alfredi) is a species of Old World warbler in the family Locustellidae.
It is found in Democratic Republic of the Congo, Ethiopia, South Sudan, Tanzania, Uganda, and Zambia.
Its natural habitats are subtropical or tropical moist montane forests and subtropical or tropical moist shrubland.

References

bamboo warbler
Birds of Sub-Saharan Africa
bamboo warbler
Taxonomy articles created by Polbot